Hexaprenyl diphosphate synthase (geranylgeranyl-diphosphate specific) (HexPS, (all-E) hexaprenyl diphosphate synthase, (all-trans) hexaprenyl diphosphate synthase, hexaprenyl pyrophosphate synthase, HexPPs, hexaprenyl diphosphate synthase) is an enzyme with systematic name geranylgeranyl-diphosphate:isopentenyl-diphosphate transferase (adding 2 isopentenyl units). This enzyme catalyses the following chemical reaction

 geranylgeranyl diphosphate + 2 isopentenyl diphosphate  2 diphosphate + all-trans-hexaprenyl diphosphate

The enzyme prefers geranylgeranyl diphosphate to farnesyl diphosphate as an allylic substrate.

References

External links 
 

EC 2.5.1